The 1872 Yale Bulldogs football team was an American football team that represented Yale University in the 1872 college football season. The team finished with a 1–0 record and was retroactively named co-national champion by Parke H. Davis. They played Columbia at Hamilton Park and won 3–0. Each team had 20 players and the field was 400 feet long and 250 wide (134 by 83 yards). Tommy Sherman scored the first goal and Lew Irwin the other two. The team's captain was David Schley Schaff, who attended the Rugby School in England where he learned to play football.

Schedule

See also
 List of the first college football game in each US state

References

Yale
Yale Bulldogs football seasons
College football national champions
College football undefeated seasons
Yale Bulldogs football